Piment Fort was a popular Quebec humoristic game show hosted by the colorful Normand Brathwaite which aired on TVA from 1993 to 2001. Piment Fort means "hot pepper" in French.

A revival of the show has been announced as part of TVA's 2016 Winter TV season.

Overview
The show's concept was to invite three humorists a week and to make them participate in a variety of games which led them to crack jokes and tell funny stories.

The show was recorded in front of a live audience (18 years and older, because there were alcoholic drinks served) in Montreal's Café Campus located on 57 Prince-Arthur East. After each game, the audience was asked to vote for the player who made the best joke or story. The winning player received a hot pepper as a trophy. If the vote was close, each player received a pepper.

List of games
This is a list of games played on the show. Each game was associated with a different hat worn by the host and decorated according to the game's theme.
Les mots croisés (The Crosswords)
A crossword game. This game was played once a week and always on Friday. The crossword theme changed each week. The host asked real questions with real answers in order to fill the crossword board, but the players always answered with jokes. A real answer was answered once in the show history.
Trouvez le mozus (Find the Schmuck)
Ça rime en crime (It Rhymes a lot)
Ils vont tellement bien ensemble (They go together really well)
Each player was asked to choose a famous person from a selected list and to choose six words from a second different list. Then the player had to explain how the words he/she chose were linked to that person.
Conférence de presse (Press conference)
This is not really a game. People in the attendance are asked to ask personal questions to the players.
Les faux proverbes (The fake proverbs)
The host gives the first words of a fictitious proverb. Each player has to finish the proverb with his/her own words.
C'est quoi ton sigle?
The host asks the meaning of a real abbreviation or acronym, but each player has his/her own interpretation.
Qu'avez-vous à déclarer? (What do you have to declare?)
Les béatitudes
The host asks the player to finish a sentence beginning with: "Bless (a famous person or a group of famous people)..."
Au pied de la lettre
Each player is assigned with a different statement. The players have to read their statement, but they have to change a selected letter by another one. Example: change the "b" for "z." Each player has 30 seconds to read their statement. 
Devine la devise (Find the motto)
Place aux poètes (Here are the poets)
Vive la différence! (Long live the difference!)
The host asks the players what is the difference between two famous people.
C'est meilleur en groupe (It's better in a group)
À quoi tu penses? (What do you think?)
Les pieds dans les plats
Ça rend sourd
A different sound is assigned to each humorist. They have to tell what it does mean.
Mission impossible
Fais ta prière
Comme maman disait (As mommy said)
On va-tu aux vues?
Y ont l'tour
L'avenir dans mes boules
J'ai mon voyage
The host gives a fictitious scenario: a famous person has gone to a selected place. Each player has to imagine what this person did there.
Avec des si... (With ifs...)
The host gives the beginning of a sentence which begins itself with the word "if." Each player is asked to finish the sentence.
Fais-moi une ligne (Draw me a line)
That game is played with a drawing board. Each humorist is shown a different abstract drawing. They all have to finish their drawing their own way and to explain the significance of the final drawing.
C'est qui? C'est qui? (Who is it? Who is it?)
A guest star invited to the show is hidden behind a big board. The host gives clues to the players in order to discover the guest's identity.
Les simagrées
This is a game based on improvisation. Each player is secretly given a person, an animal or an event by the host. The player has to mime it and the other two players have to guess what the active player wants to tell them.
La grosse légume (The big vegetable)
A guest star invited to the show is hidden in a hot pepper costume. The players have to ask questions to the hidden guest in order to discover his/her identity.
Le sac sur la tête (The bag on the head)
The game begins as every player has a bag on the head. When it's his/her turn, one player puts off his/her bag and he/she discovers that everybody in the attendance has a bag on their head. There's a guest star hidden in the bag-headed crowd and the player has to put the bag of the head of every person he seeks in order to find the guest. Each player is given limited time and if he/she passes through his/her own time, it's another player turn to try.
Le détecteur de mensonges (The Lie Detector)
Strip tease
Connais-tu l'histoire du gars (Do you know the guy's story?)
The most popular game of the show. Each humorist tells a joke or a hilarious story of his/her choice.
Top secret
The host asks the players to tell what they think is the biggest secret kept by a famous person.
Le début de la fin (The beginning of the end)
The host gives the beginning and the end of a fictitious story. Each part is completely different from the other. Player 1 has to tell the story by saying the beginning words already given and to go on with his/her own ideas during a given time. Then, player 2 has to pursue the story where player 1 left off. Player 3 pursues second player's part and has to end the story with the words given by the host before the game started.

List of players
This is a list of humorists who have already participated in the show.

External links
Official website

1990s Canadian game shows
2000s Canadian game shows
Television shows filmed in Montreal
1993 Canadian television series debuts
TVA (Canadian TV network) original programming
2001 Canadian television series endings